The Filmfare Best Male Playback Award - Kannada is given by the Filmfare magazine as part of its annual Filmfare Awards for Kannada films.

Superlatives

Winners

References

Male Playback Singer